William Winkelman (January 14, 1933 – September 5, 2014) was an American politician who served in the Iowa House of Representatives from 1963 to 1973 and in the Iowa Senate from 1973 to 1977.

He died on September 5, 2014, in Des Moines, Iowa at age 81.

References

1933 births
2014 deaths
Republican Party members of the Iowa House of Representatives
Republican Party Iowa state senators